This is the progression of world record improvements of the 3000 metres M40 division of Masters athletics.  Records must be set in properly conducted, official competitions under the standing IAAF rules unless modified by World Masters Athletics.  

The M40 division consists of male athletes who have reached the age of 40 but have not yet reached the age of 45, so exactly from their 40th birthday to the day before their 45th birthday. vandeWansem set his record on his 40th birthday.
Key

References

Masters Athletics 3000 m list

Masters athletics world record progressions